Waltham High School is a public high school located in Waltham, Massachusetts, United States. It is the only high school operated by Waltham Public Schools.

History
The current Waltham High School was constructed in 1968 and expanded in 1998 and 2002.

In 2018, Waltham Public Schools exercised eminent domain to buy land for a new Waltham High School. A $374 million loan for a new high school project was approved in 2019; it was the largest loan in Massachusetts history for a public high school. Construction started in September 2020, with the goal of having the new high school finished by the 2024-2025 school year. The school was originally slated to open for the 2020-21 school year before numerous issues in the site plan, acquisition, design and construction processes shifted the opening date back.

Athletics
In 1906 and 1907, the Waltham football team was undefeated, although there was no organized playoff structure.

Performing arts
Waltham fields two competitive show choirs, the mixed-gender "Music Unlimited" and the all-female "Music Express". The school previously also had a lower-level mixed-gender group, "Music Odyssey". The program hosts an annual competition, the Eastern Show Choir Festival.

Notable people
Alumni

Mackenzy Bernadeau, professional football player
Rob Chiarelli, multiple Grammy Award winner
Pauline R. Kezer, politician
Jeff Lazaro, professional hockey player
Mike Mangini, drummer
Tony Massarotti, sportswriter and radio personality
Normie Roy, professional baseball player
Fred Smerlas, professional football player
Joe Zeno, professional football player

Faculty
 Harry A. Dame, athletic director and football coach
 Hal Kopp, football coach

References

External links

 Official web site

School buildings completed in 1969
Schools in Middlesex County, Massachusetts
Public high schools in Massachusetts